In physics, and especially scattering theory, the momentum-transfer cross section (sometimes known as the momentum-transport cross section) is an effective scattering cross section useful for describing the average momentum transferred from a particle when it collides with a target.  Essentially, it contains all the information about a scattering process necessary for calculating average momentum transfers but ignores other details about the scattering angle.

The momentum-transfer cross section  is defined in terms of an (azimuthally symmetric and momentum independent) differential cross section  by 

The momentum-transfer cross section can be written in terms of the phase shifts from a partial wave analysis as

Explanation

The factor of  arises as follows.  Let the incoming particle be traveling along the -axis with vector momentum

Suppose the particle scatters off the target with polar angle  and azimuthal angle  plane. Its new momentum is

For collision to much heavier target than striking particle (ex: electron incident on the atom or ion),  so

By conservation of momentum, the target has acquired momentum

Now, if many particles scatter off the target, and the target is assumed to have azimuthal symmetry, then the radial ( and ) components of the transferred momentum will average to zero.  The average momentum transfer will be just .  If we do the full averaging over all possible scattering events, we get

where the total cross section is

Here, the averaging is done by using expected value calculation (see  as a probability density function). Therefore, for a given total cross section, one does not need to compute new integrals for every possible momentum in order to determine the average momentum transferred to a target.   One just needs to compute .

Application
This concept is used in calculating charge radius of nuclei such as proton and deuteron by electron scattering experiments.

To this purpose a useful quantity called the scattering vector  having the dimension of inverse length is defined as a function of energy  and scattering angle :

References

Momentum
Scattering theory